Michel-Joseph Gentil de Chavagnac, full name Adolphe Michel Joseph Gentil de Chavagnac, (Paris, 3 July 1770 – Passy, 27 May 1846) was a 19th-century French chansonnier and playwright.

Biography 
After a career in the army, he became known in theater as Marc-Antoine Madeleine Désaugiers's collaborator with whom he published more than thirty plays.

His plays, often circumstantial, were presented on the most important Parisian stages of his time, including the Théâtre des Variétés, the Théâtre de la Porte-Saint-Martin, the Théâtre du Vaudeville, the Théâtre de l'Opéra-Comique etc.

Works 

 La Comédie chez l'épicier, ou le Manuscrit retrouvé, vaudeville-anecdote in 1 act, with Désaugiers, 1808
 La Jeunesse de Favart, comédie anecdotique in 1 act, in prose, mingled with vaudevilles, with Antoine-Pierre-Charles Favart, 1808
 Hector ou Le valet de carreau, jeu de cartes in 5 parts, with Désaugiers and Rougemont, 1809
 M. La Gobe, ou Un jour de carnaval, folie-vaudeville in 1 act, with Désaugiers, 1809
 La petite Cendrillon ou La chatte merveilleuse, folie-vaudeville in 1 act, with Désaugiers, 1810
 Les sabotiers béarnais ou La faute d'orthographe, vaudeville in 1 act, in prose, with Commagny, 1810
 Les Fêtes françaises, ou Paris en miniature, entertainment in 1 act, with Michel-Nicolas Balisson de Rougemont, 1810
 La petite gouvernante, comedy in 2 acts and in prose, mingled with vaudevilles, with Charles-François-Jean-Baptiste Moreau de Commagny, 1811
 L'ogresse ou La belle au bois dormant, vaudeville-folie-comi-parade in 1 act, with Désaugiers, 1811
 La Bonne nouvelle, ou le Premier arrivé, vaudeville in 1 act, 1811
 Bayard à La Ferté ou Le siège de Mézières, opéra comique in 2 acts, with Désaugiers, 1811
 Les auvergnats ou L'eau et le vin, vaudeville grivois in 1 act, with Désaugiers, 1812
 La matrimoniomanie, comedy in 1 act, with Rougemont and Désaugiers, 1812
 Monsieur Désornières, ou Faut-il rire ? faut-il pleurer ? folie in 1 act and in vaudevilles, with Désaugiers, 1812
 Pierrot ou Le diamant perdu, comédie-vaudeville in 2 acts, with Désaugiers, 1813
 Le Bûcheron de Salerne ou Les Souhaits, comedy-féerie in 1 act, mingled with vaudevilles, with Désaugiers, 1814
 L'Hôtel garni, ou la Leçon singulière, comedy in 1 act, with Désaugiers, 1814
 Le Petit enfant prodigue, comedy in 1 act, mingled with vaudevilles, with Désaugiers, 1814
 Le Sabre de bois, ou la Revue du roi, comedy in 1 act, mingled with vaudevilles, with Rougemont, 1814
 Le Retour des lys, à-propos in 1 act and in vaudeville, with Désaugiers, 1814
 L'Île de l'espérance, ou le Songe réalisé, allegorical play in 1 act, mingled with vaudevilles, with Désaugiers et Brazier, 1814
 Une journée au camp, comical melodrama in 2 acts, mingled with vaudevilles, with Désaugiers, 1815
 Les Deux voisines ou Les Prêtés rendus, comedy in 1 act, with Désaugiers, 1815
 Le Vaudeville en vendanges, petit à-propos villageois in 1 act, mingled with couplets, with Désaugiers and Commagny, 1815
 Le Bouquet du Roi, ou le Marché aux fleurs, à propos in 1 act, mingled with vaudevilles, with Désaugiers, 1815
 Monsieur Sans-Gêne ou L'ami de collège, vaudeville in 1 act, with Désaugiers, 1816
 Mariage de Mgr le duc de Berri, with Désaugiers, 1816
 Le Dix-sept juin, ou l'Heureuse journée, à-propos in 1 act, mingled with vaudevilles, with Désaugiers, 1816
 Les Visites bourgeoises, ou le Dehors et le dedans, little sketch of a grand scene, in 1 act, mingled with couplets, with Désaugiers and Commagny, 1816
 Chacun son tour, ou l'Écho de Paris, divertissement villageois in vaudevilles, with de Chazet and Désaugiers, 1816
 Chansons chantées aux Champs-Élysées pour la fête du roi, le 25 August 1817, with Désaugiers and Jacques-André Jacquelin, 1817
 Je fais mes farces, folie in 1 act, mingled with couplets, with Brazier et Désaugiers, 1817
 La Petite coquette, comédie-vaudeville in 1 act, with Désaugiers, 1817
 La Vendange normande, ou les Deux voisins, vaudeville in 1 act, with Alexandre Barrière, 1817
 Les Anniversaires des trois mai et huit juillet, with Marc-Antoine Désaugiers, 1818
 La Statue de Henri IV, ou la Fête du Pont-Neuf, tableau grivois in 1 act, with de Chazet, Désaugiers and Joseph Pain, 1818
 Couplets pour l'inauguration de la statue de Henri IV chantés à la représentation de l'Académie royale de musique, 24 August 1818, with Désaugiers, 1818
 Les Deux Valentin, ou les Nouveaux Ménechmes, comédie-vaudeville in 1 act, with Désaugiers, 1818
 Le bucheron de Salerne ou Les trois souhaits, 1819
 Les Petites Danaïdes, ou 99 victimes, imitation burlesco-tragi-comi-diabolico-féerie of the opera the Danaïdes , mingled with vaudevilles, danses, with Désaugiers, 1819
 Le Prêté rendu, comédie mêlée de couplets, with Rougemont and Mélesville, 1819
 Le jeune Werther, ou Les grandes passions, vaudeville in 1 act, with Désaugiers, 1819
 Le Berceau du prince, ou les Dames de Bordeaux, à-propos vaudeville in 1 act, with Nicolas Brazier, René de Chazet, Désaugiers and Jean-Baptiste Dubois, 1820
 Scènes en l'honneur de la naissance de Mgr le duc de Bordeaux, with Désaugiers, 1820
 Un Dîner à Pantin, ou l'Amphytrion à la diète, tableau-vaudeville in 1 act, with Désaugiers and Nicolas Gersin, 1820
 Le Baptême de village, ou le Parrain de circonstance, vaudeville in 1 act, with de Bury, Ledoux de la Croisette and Désaugiers, 1821
 Les Étrennes du vaudeville, ou la Pièce impromptu, folie-parade in 1 act, mingled with couplets, with Désaugiers and Francis baron d'Allarde, 1821
 Vadeboncoeur, ou le Retour au village, vaudeville in 1 act, with Désaugiers, 1822
 Une visite aux Invalides, à-propos mingled with couplets, with de Bury and Ledoux, 1822
 Le comte d'Angoulême, ou Le siège de Gênes, with Fulgence de Bury, Paul Ledoux and Ramond de la Croisette, 1823
 Les maris sans femmes ou une heure de paternité, vaudeville in 1 act, with Désaugiers, 1823
 M. Oculi, ou la Cataracte, imitation burlesque de Valérie , in 1 act and in vaudevilles, with Désaugiers, 1823
 Plus de Pyrénées, à-propos-vaudeville in 1 act, with Désaugiers, 1823
 La Route de Bordeaux, à-propos in 1 act and in free verses, with Désaugiers and Gersin, 1823
 Chansons pour la S. Louis, with Frédéric de Courcy, 1824
 Fenêtres à louer, ou les Deux propriétaires, vaudeville in 1 act, with Désaugiers, 1825
 Les petites danaïdes, 1846
 Recueil de chansons et poésies fugitives, undated
 Stances sur la naissance du roi de Rome, undated
 La Cause et les effets (et autres chansons royalistes), with Désaugiers, undated
 Le siége de Gênes, comédie héroïque in 2 acts, with de Bury et Ledoux, undated

 References 

 Bibliography 
 François Xavier de Feller, Biographie universelle, 1850, (p. 75) (Read online)
 Béatrice Didier, Le XVIIIe siècle: 1778-1820, vol.3, 1976, (p. 322)
 Jean-Louis Tamvaco, Ivor Forbes Guest, Les cancans de l'Opéra'', 2000, (p. 21)

1770 births
1846 deaths
19th-century French dramatists and playwrights
French chansonniers
Writers from Paris